Tafiły  is a village in the administrative district of Gmina Stawiski, within Kolno County, Podlaskie Voivodeship, in north-eastern Poland.

The village has a population of 62.

Tafiły was the seat of the Tafiłowski noble family. In 1827, the village had a population of 26.

The Polish S61 highway runs nearby, west of the village.

References

Villages in Kolno County